William Wayne Heindl Jr. (May 13, 1946 – March 1, 1992) was a Canadian professional ice hockey left winger who played 18 games in the National Hockey League for the Minnesota North Stars and New York Rangers between 1970 and 1972, and in the World Hockey Association with the Cleveland Crusaders during the 1973–74 season. Internationally he played for the Canadian national team at the 1969 World Championships.

Playing career
Heindl began his junior hockey career in Winnipeg, Manitoba, playing for the Winnipeg Braves, and then joined the Oshawa Generals of the Ontario Hockey Association for the 1965–66 season. That year Oshawa played in the Memorial Cup, and Heindl put up impressive numbers, scoring 13 goals and 21 points in the playoffs that year. After one season in Oshawa, Heindl joined the Eastern Hockey League's Clinton Comets, where he had his most productive season as a professional scoring 52 goals in 1967–68.  He then spent a couple years with the Canadian National Team and was a member of the squad that played in the 1969 World Ice Hockey Championships. He had four goals and an assist in nine games for the fourth place Canadians.

While his NHL rights were held by the Boston Bruins, Heindl never played for the parent club, and in 1970 was claimed by the Minnesota North Stars from Boston in the NHL reverse draft. Over the next two seasons, Heindl spent more time playing for Minnesota's American Hockey League affiliate the Cleveland Barons than in the NHL, and was left unprotected for the 1972 NHL Expansion Draft, where he was claimed by the incoming Atlanta Flames. Atlanta quickly traded him to the New York Rangers for Bill Hogaboam, and he played four games for New York, which was the end of his NHL career. The following season Heindl joined the World Hockey Association's Cleveland Crusaders, who had acquired his WHA rights from the Winnipeg Jets. After two seasons playing in Sweden with BK Backen, Heindl retired from professional hockey in 1977. He turned to coaching, serving for a time as the bench boss of the Steinbach Huskies who reached the 1979 Allan Cup final, but lost the Canadian senior championship to the Petrolia Squires.

His father was Manitoba Hockey Hall of Fame and Manitoba Sports Hall of Fame and Museum Honoured Member Bill Heindl Sr., who also played for – and won – the Memorial Cup in 1941 with the Winnipeg Rangers.

Personal life
Heindl's coaching career was ended by a car accident in which he suffered a serious back injury. Coupled with the death of his father and a failed marriage, he fell into alcoholism and depression. He attempted suicide in 1980 by jumping off a bridge in Winnipeg. Heindl survived, but was left a paraplegic. He was supported by his former hockey teammates, including Bobby Orr, with whom he played in Oshawa as a junior.  Orr organized a charity game in Winnipeg to raise money for Heindl.  The game, played April 25, 1980, was played between former professional players and former members of the Canadian National Team and was attended by over 15,000 people at the Winnipeg Arena. Over $85,000 was raised for Heindl's recovery. Among the players to join Orr was Wayne Gretzky, and the event marked the only time the two NHL superstars played in the same game.

Heindl's outlook improved, and he became an administrative assistant with the Canadian Paraplegic Association. He encouraged his friends and associates to help raise money for spinal cord research, the result of which became an annual golf tournament in Winnipeg which had raised over $200,000 in its first nine years. The event, called "The Will To Win" helped fund Winnipeg's Spinal Chord Research Centre.

Career statistics

Regular season and playoffs

International

Source: Legends Of Hockey (HHOF)

Awards and achievements
 MJHL Second All-Star Team (1965)
 Turnbull Cup MJHL Championship (1965)

References

External links
 

1946 births
1992 deaths
Canadian ice hockey left wingers
Cape Codders players
Cleveland Barons (1937–1973) players
Cleveland Crusaders players
Clinton Comets players
Ice hockey people from Quebec
Jacksonville Barons players
Minnesota North Stars players
New York Rangers players
Oshawa Generals players
Providence Reds players
Sportspeople from Sherbrooke
Winnipeg Braves players